Power Play is a 2003 American action film directed by Joseph Zito and starring Dylan Walsh, Alison Eastwood, Tobin Bell and Brixton Karnes.

Some action scenes were filmed in the city of Curitiba, Brazil.

Plot 
Journalist Matt Nash's (Dylan Walsh) investigations always get him in trouble. He is shot during his research in the drug scene and survives due to a bulletproof vest. The journal's editor-in-chief plans to fire him to preserve the good reputation of The Examiner. She gives him one last chance and charges him with a seemingly harmless job of finding three missing environmental activists. This trio previously penetrated into the headquarters of the power company known as Saturn Energy and stole data on a secret project. Here, the three activists are discovered and killed by employees of the company under the leadership of the security chiefs Clemens (Tobin Bell).

Matt makes contact with the group and is given access to a secret entrance to the company's premises outside the city. There he discovers that the company is searching for an alternative energy source. A trial operation quickly acquires access to the grid of Los Angeles, explaining the blackouts which have been affecting the town. The technique, however, has one major drawback: the production of energy creates a tremendous amount of heat that must be dissipated. It is conducted on the premises in the ground. In the ground beneath where the site is located, however, a crack develops, which leads to an uncontrolled discharge of the heat. An employee of the company finds out that in this way the chances are increased for an earthquake in town. He wants to warn the public of the experiments, but dies in an explosion.

Meanwhile, Matt has managed to win the trust of Gabrielle St. John (Alison Eastwood), a manager of the company. With their help, he discovers the crimes of the three environmental activists. Preparations for a last experiment in the research facility are in full swing. For the first time, the plant will continue at full speed. However, this threatens a massive earthquake that could destroy the entire city. Matt and Gabrielle again give access to the research site. They manage to sabotage the plant and destroy it. The ex-minister, Clement, and his staff are arrested.

Cast
 Dylan Walsh as Matt Nash
 Alison Eastwood as Gabriella St. John
 Tobin Bell as Clemens
 Brixton Karnes as Travis Gentry
 Frank Birney as D.C.
 Boti Bliss as Sara Rose
 Mark Hutter as Abbott
 Jan Munroe as McCullough
 Martin Papazian as Joel
 Victor Raider-Wexler as Dr. Eisley
 Kimi Reichenberg as Rita
 Paulo Reis as Zendon
 Marcia Strassman as Susan Breecher
 Jaimz Woolvett as Todd
 Julia Davis as LAPD Officer
 Andre Robinson as Detective

Sources

External links
 
 

2003 films
2003 action films
American action films
Films directed by Joseph Zito
Films scored by Joseph Bishara
2000s English-language films
2000s American films